Maigret Goes to School (French: Maigret à l'école) is a 1954 detective novel by the Belgian writer Georges Simenon featuring his character Jules Maigret.

Plot
In the story, Maigret is called from his usual duties in Paris to investigate a murder in a small village located close to La Rochelle. A local postmistress has been killed and suspicion has fallen on the local schoolmaster. When Maigret gets there, he discovers a very inward-looking community, which generally hated the dead woman because she knew all of their secrets.

Adaptations
It has been adapted several times for television. In 1992, it was made into an episode of an ITV Maigret series.

References

1954 Belgian novels
Maigret novels
Novels set in France
Presses de la Cité books